Timothy "Tim" M. Seaman (born May 14, 1972) is an American race walker who competed at the 2000 and 2004 Olympics.

Seaman made a habit of winning the 5000 metres racewalk at the USA Indoor Track and Field Championships. He won the event 13-times winning consecutive years from 1998 to 2007,  and in 2009, 2010 and 2013. His 13 USA Indoor titles rank highest in the sport's history. Seaman is also seven-time USA 20 km champion, winning in 1998, 2000, 2002, 2004, 2005, 2009 and 2014.  On April 20, 2004, he set the still standing American record in the 10-km walk at 39:22.7 in Storetveitmarsje, Norway. 
As a collegiate athlete, Seaman was a four-time National Association of Intercollegiate Athletics (NAIA) race walk champion while competing for the University of Wisconsin-Parkside. 

Seaman is currently the cross country, women's track and field and distance running coach for Cuyamaca College. His wife Rachel Seaman is also an Olympic racewalker.

Achievements

See also
 World Fit

References

External links

Profile from USATF

1972 births
Living people
American male racewalkers
Athletes (track and field) at the 1999 Pan American Games
Athletes (track and field) at the 2003 Pan American Games
Athletes (track and field) at the 2000 Summer Olympics
Athletes (track and field) at the 2004 Summer Olympics
Olympic track and field athletes of the United States
Track and field athletes from Rhode Island
Track and field athletes from California
USA Outdoor Track and Field Championships winners
USA Indoor Track and Field Championships winners
Pan American Games track and field athletes for the United States